Univision Canada is a Canadian Spanish language specialty channel owned by TLN Media Group, in partnership with TelevisaUnivision USA, the leading Spanish-language media company in the United States. Univision Canada broadcasts a variety of programming, including news, dramas, talk shows, sports, and more.

History
In September 2006, Telelatino Network was granted approval from the Canadian Radio-television and Telecommunications Commission (CRTC) to launch a television channel called Spanish Entertainment TV 1, described as "a national, ethnic Category 2 specialty programming service devoted to the Spanish-speaking community with a particular emphasis on programming of interest to female and youth audiences."

The channel launched on October 23, 2007 as TLN en Español.

On January 28, 2014, Corus announced that they would rebrand the network Univision Canada after reaching a brand licensing agreement with their long-term partner, Univision Communications, which, outside of fringe reception of Seattle Univision affiliate KUNS-TV into the Vancouver market and Cleveland, Ohio owned and operated station WQHS-DT into parts of the London, Ontario market, has no presence of their main American network into Canada.  The channel officially switched over to Univision Canada on May 5, 2014.

On May 31, 2016, Univision Canada launched on Cogeco.

Programming
Univision Canada airs programming from Univision, the most popular Spanish-language television network in the United States. It also airs programming from UniMás and TUDN. Unlike Univision in the United States, Univision Canada does not air programming from TelevisaUnivision's Mexican network, Las Estrellas, as that network is available on selected cable systems in Canada.

The service also produces and airs select documentary films and live entertainment specials created specifically for the Spanish-language community in Canada, as well as the community newsmagazine series Nash.

Noted series 
 Aqui y Ahora
 Despierta America
 El Gordo y la Flaca
 Latin Angels
 Noticiero Univision
 Primer Impacto
 Contacto Deportivo
 Cine en Familia

See also
 Univision
 UniMás
 TUDN

References

External links
  

Canada
Digital cable television networks in Canada
Multicultural and ethnic television in Canada
Television channels and stations established in 2007
Spanish-language television stations
Latin American Canadian culture
Spanish-Canadian culture